Synlestes weyersii is a species of Australian damselfly in the family Synlestidae,
commonly known as a bronze needle. 
It is endemic to south-eastern Australia, where it inhabits streams and rivers.

Synlestes weyersii is a large to very large damselfly, coloured a metallic bronze-black to green-black with yellow markings. It perches with its wings partially or fully outspread.

Gallery

See also
 List of Odonata species of Australia

References 

Synlestidae
Odonata of Australia
Insects of Australia
Endemic fauna of Australia
Taxa named by Edmond de Sélys Longchamps
Insects described in 1869
Damselflies